Ralph Poppell is a Florida Republican (United States) politician who served as a Representative in the House of Representatives of the U.S. state of Florida. He was first elected to the Florida House in 2002 and left office due to term limitation in 2010.

Rep. Poppell was born on April 30, 1941. He is married to Connie Poppell, who is from Vero Beach, Florida. They have four children, a girl and three boys, Tamra, Tim, Tyler, and Doug.

From 1960 to 1965, he worked as an assistant production manager for Indian River Exchange Packers. He then worked as a production manager till 1969 for Neving Ideal. He was general manager for Pulitzer Groves from 1969 till 1979. He owned two businesses, Poppell Groves from 1971 to 1997, and Float-On Trailers from 1985 to 2000.

References

External links
Florida House of Representatives Profile

Republican Party members of the Florida House of Representatives
1941 births
Living people